Saint-Henri—Westmount (formerly known as Westmount) was a federal electoral district in Quebec, Canada, that was represented in the House of Commons of Canada from 1968 to 1997.

"Saint-Henri" was created in 1966 from parts of Mount Royal, Notre-Dame-de-Grâce, Outremont—St-Jean, Saint-Antoine—Westmount, and St. Lawrence—St. George ridings.

In 1978, it was renamed "Saint-Henri—Westmount". In 1996, it was abolished when it was merged into LaSalle—Émard riding.

Members of Parliament

This riding elected the following Members of Parliament:

Election results

Westmount

Saint-Henri—Westmount

By-election: Resignation of David Berger, 28 December 1994

See also 

 List of Canadian federal electoral districts
 Past Canadian electoral districts

External links 
Riding history of Westmount from the Library of Parliament
 Riding history of Saint-Henri—Westmount from the Library of Parliament

Former federal electoral districts of Quebec